This article show all participating team squads at the 2008 FIVB Volleyball World League, played by 16 countries from 13 June to 27 July 2008. The Final Round was held in Rio de Janeiro, Brazil.

The following is the Brazilian roster in the 2008 FIVB Volleyball World League.

The following is the  roster in the 2008 FIVB Volleyball World League.

The following is the  roster in the 2008 FIVB Volleyball World League.

The following is the  roster in the 2008 FIVB Volleyball World League.

The following is the  roster in the 2008 FIVB Volleyball World League.

The following is the  roster in the 2008 FIVB Volleyball World League.

The following is the  roster in the 2008 FIVB Volleyball World League.

The following is the  roster in the 2008 FIVB Volleyball World League.

The following is the  roster in the 2008 FIVB Volleyball World League.

The following is the  roster in the 2008 FIVB Volleyball World League.

The following is the  roster in the 2008 FIVB Volleyball World League.

The following is the  roster in the 2008 FIVB Volleyball World League.

The following is the  roster in the 2008 FIVB Volleyball World League.

The following is the  roster in the 2008 FIVB Volleyball World League.

The following is the  roster in the 2008 FIVB Volleyball World League.

The following is the  roster in the 2008 FIVB Volleyball World League.

References

External links
Official website

2008
2008 in volleyball